Stanley Drayton (born March 11, 1971) is an American football coach. He is currently the head coach at Temple University. He formerly served as the associate head coach, running backs coach, and run game coordinator at The University of Texas at Austin and also coached running backs for the Chicago Bears and Ohio State.

Biography
Drayton was born on March 11, 1971, in Cleveland, Ohio. He attended Allegheny College, where he played running back on the football team. As a sophomore, Drayton helped lead the Gators to the 1990 NCAA Division III national championship, and ended his career as the top rusher in Division III history (record later broken). He also competed in track and field, winning numerous NCAC titles, and earned all-conference honors in both sports. Drayton is married to Monique Fuller and has two children.

Career

Early career
Drayton held running back coaching positions with the Eastern Michigan Eagles (1994), Penn Quakers (1995), Villanova Wildcats (1996–1999), and Bowling Green Falcons (2000), before being hired by the Green Bay Packers as Assistant Offensive Quality Control and Special Teams Coach from 2001 to 2003.

Following his time with the Packers he worked as a running backs coach with the Mississippi State Bulldogs (2004), Florida Gators (2005–2007), Tennessee Volunteers (2008), and Syracuse Orange (2009). He returned to the Gators for the 2010 campaign.

In January 2011, Drayton was hired as a wide receivers coach by the Ohio State Buckeyes. Following the 2011 season, he was reassigned to the role of running backs coach, under new head coach Urban Meyer (his former boss and mentor at Florida). He also served as assistant head coach in 2013 and 2014. Under Drayton's tutelage, Buckeye running back Carlos Hyde recorded 1,521 yards and 15 touchdowns, while also recording the eighth-highest yardage per game in the nation with 126.8. In 2014, Drayton guided Ezekiel Elliott to 1,878 yards, third-most in the country and the second-most in Ohio State history.

Chicago Bears
In February 2015, Drayton was hired as a running backs coach for the Chicago Bears. In Drayton's first year, the running back trio of Matt Forte, Jeremy Langford and Ka'Deem Carey ended the 2015 season sixth in rushing attempts with 469 and 11th in total rushing yards with 1,851. The group also ranked 11th in the league in rushing yards per game with 115.7. Forte led the three in attempts (218), yards (898) and yards per attempt (4.1) despite not playing in three due to injury, while Langford had the most touchdowns with six. Playing in eleven games, Carey scored twice on 43 attempts. A year later, with Drayton, rookie Jordan Howard recorded 1,313 rushing yards in 2016, the second-highest in the NFL behind Elliott.

Texas
Drayton returned to the college ranks in 2017, joining the Texas Longhorns.

Temple 
On December 15, 2021, Drayton and Temple agreed to terms for him to become the next head football coach of the Owls. On September 10, 2022, Drayton won his first game as the Head Coach of the Owls against the Lafayette Leopards.

Head coaching record

References

External links
 Texas profile

1971 births
Living people
American football running backs
Allegheny Gators football players
Allegheny Gators football coaches
Bowling Green Falcons football coaches
Chicago Bears coaches
Eastern Michigan Eagles football coaches
Florida Gators football coaches
Green Bay Packers coaches
Mississippi State Bulldogs football coaches
Ohio State Buckeyes football coaches
Penn Quakers football coaches
Syracuse Orange football coaches
Temple Owls football coaches
Tennessee Volunteers football coaches
Texas Longhorns football coaches
Villanova Wildcats football coaches
Sportspeople from Cleveland